This is a list of events from British radio in 1924.

Events

January
 1 January - The Meteorological Office issues its first broadcast Shipping Forecast, at this time called Weather Shipping.
 15 January - The world's first radio play, Danger by Richard Hughes, is broadcast by the British Broadcasting Company from its studios in London.

February
5 February - Hourly Greenwich Time Signal from Royal Greenwich Observatory is broadcast for the first time.
24 February - The first broadcasts from the British Broadcasting Company's 6FL Sheffield radio station listed in The Radio Times.

March
28 March - First broadcasts from the 5PY Plymouth radio station listed in The Radio Times.

April
23 April - First broadcast by King George V, opening the British Empire Exhibition at Wembley Stadium.

May
1 May - The first broadcasts from the 2EH Edinburgh radio station listed in The Radio Times.
19 May - The British Broadcasting Company first broadcasts cellist Beatrice Harrison apparently duetting live with a wild nightingale in a Surrey garden; not until 2022 is it admitted that the 'bird' was probably a siffleur (professional whistler).

June
11 June - First broadcasts from the 2LV Liverpool radio station listed in The Radio Times.

July
8 July - First broadcasts from the 2LS Leeds radio station listed in The Radio Times.

August
15 August - First broadcasts from the 6KH Hull radio station listed in The Radio Times.

September
15 September - First broadcasts from the 2BE Belfast radio station listed in The Radio Times.
16 September - First broadcasts from the 5NG Nottingham radio station listed in The Radio Times.

October
21 October - First broadcasts from the 6ST Stoke radio station listed in The Radio Times.

November
12 November - First broadcasts from the 2DE Dundee radio station listed in The Radio Times.

December
12 December - First broadcasts from the 5SX Swansea radio station listed in The Radio Times.
28 December - First broadcasts from the 5XX Daventry radio station listed in The Radio Times.

Births
11 February - Douglas Smith, radio announcer (died 1972)
20 April - Leslie Phillips, comic actor (died 2022)
23 April - Norman Painting, actor (died 2009)
1 May - Dennis Main Wilson, broadcast comedy producer (died 1997)
12 May - Tony Hancock, comedian (died 1968)
31 July - Garard Green, actor (died 2004)
15 November - Mike Raven, born (Austin) Churton Fairman, DJ, actor and sculptor (died 1997)

Notes

References 

 
Years in British radio
Radio